Dennis Gannon Lonergan (30 March 1906 – 15 September 1965) was an Australian politician.

He was born in Deloraine, Tasmania. In 1945 he was elected to the Tasmanian Legislative Council as an independent member for the seat of Hobart. In 1946 the seat, which had had three members, was divided and Lonergan was assigned the seat of Newdegate, which he held until his defeat in 1951. He died in New Norfolk in 1965.

References

1906 births
1965 deaths
Independent members of the Parliament of Tasmania
Members of the Tasmanian Legislative Council
20th-century Australian politicians